The 1952 Vanderbilt Commodores football team represented Vanderbilt University during the 1952 college football season. The team's head coach was Bill Edwards, who was in his fourth and final year as the Commodores' head coach.  Members of the Southeastern Conference, the Commodores played their home games at Dudley Field in Nashville, Tennessee.  In 1952, Vanderbilt went 3–5–2 overall with a conference record of 1–4–1.

Schedule

References

Vanderbilt
Vanderbilt Commodores football seasons
Vanderbilt Commodores football